Claudio Villa (born Claudio Pica; 1 January 1926 – 7 February 1987) was an Italian singer and actor.

Biography

Tenor Claudio Villa was born Claudio Pica in the Trastevere quarter of Rome in 1926.  He recorded over 3000 songs, sold 45 million records, and appeared in 25 musicals during his career.

His parents gave him the name "Claudio" in honor of Claudio Serio. Many songs made famous by Villa, like "'A Tazza 'E Cafe'," were recorded for the Fonit Cetra label.

Villa died in 1987; on his gravestone are the words "Vita sei bella, morte fai schifo" ("Life, you are fine; death, you stink").

Together with Domenico Modugno Villa holds the record for the most wins at the Sanremo Music Festival, where he won the competition in 1955, 1957, 1962 and 1967. In 1963 he won the Festival di Napoli with the song "Jamme ja". He also sang at another Italian music competition, Canzonissima, a television event shown on RAI from 1956 to 1974. He won Canzonissima in 1964 with "O sole mio" and in 1966 with "Granada". He competed in the Eurovision Song Contest: in 1962 he sang "Addio, addio" and came in ninth; in 1967 he sang "Non andare più lontano", finishing eleventh.

In 1957, he was subjected to a curious trial by the Sorrisi e Canzoni magazine, after his declaration deemed presumptuous and immodest (the famous phrase of the "pedestal"), in which the public was asked to vote for guilt or acquittal. He will be acquitted. The same procedure will be repeated in 1960, and from the pages of the magazine he will receive a defensive harangue by Pier Paolo Pasolini, who will take sides for the singer's acquittal. He will be acquitted with the vote of 138,225 readers.
 
His death in 1987 by a heart attack was announced live by host Pippo Baudo during the last night of that year's Sanremo Festival. His tomb, surrounded by bas-relief and wall-paintings made in occasion of 20th anniversary of death, is located in San Sebastiano cemetery in Rocca di Papa, near Rome, where he lived for many years with his family.

The singer was largely unknown in North America until the 1996 film Big Night was released, co-directed by Stanley Tucci and Campbell Scott. The film won international acclaim. The soundtrack includes three Claudio Villa songs: "Stornelli Amorosi", "La Strada Del Bosco" and "Tic Ti, Tic Ta". According to the liner notes accompanying the CD, "Stanley grew up listening to vocalists such as Carlo Buti and Claudio Villa, huge names in Italy but little known here. Villa is a master of the stornello, a traditional song style that we thought had just the right, delicate feeling for the film's opening. But we and co-director Campbell Scott were further amazed by Villa when in the editing room, we chanced upon his boisterous "Tic Ti, Tic Ta" and his shamelessly romantic "La Strada del Bosco".

In 1976 however, Villa did cross the atlantic for a tour of eastern Canada, notably in Montreal, Toronto and Ottawa. He also travelled to perform in New York. In Montreal he played three consecutive nights at Cinema Riviera. He performed with his regular band except for the guitarist and bassisit who were local musicians. The guitarist was a well known Italian Montreal musician named Franco Barbuto.

Selected filmography
 Song of Spring (1951)
 Serenata amara (1952)
 Solo per te Lucia (1952)
 Love Song (1954)
 Ore 10: lezione di canto (1955)
 Primo applauso (1956)
 Serenate per 16 bionde (1957)
 L'amore nasce a Roma (1958) 
 Fountain of Trevi (1960)

References

1926 births
1987 deaths
Italian atheists
Eurovision Song Contest entrants for Italy
Eurovision Song Contest entrants of 1962
Eurovision Song Contest entrants of 1967
Sanremo Music Festival winners
Singers from Rome
20th-century Italian male  singers